The Fall of Arthur is an unfinished poem by J. R. R. Tolkien that is concerned with the legend of King Arthur. A posthumous first edition of the poem was published by HarperCollins in May 2013.

The poem is alliterative, extending to nearly 1,000 verses imitating the Old English Beowulf metre in Modern English, and inspired by high medieval Arthurian fiction. The historical setting of the poem is early medieval, both in form (using Germanic verse) and in content, showing Arthur as a Migration period British military leader fighting the Saxon invasion. At the same time, it avoids the high medieval aspects of the Arthurian cycle, such as the Grail and the courtly setting. The poem begins with a British "counter-invasion" to the Saxon lands (Arthur eastward in arms purposed).

Composition history
Tolkien wrote the poem during the earlier part of the 1930s, when he was Rawlinson and Bosworth Professor of Anglo-Saxon at Pembroke College, Oxford. He abandoned it at some point after 1934, most likely in 1937 when he was occupied with preparing The Hobbit for publication. Its composition thus dates to shortly after his The Lay of Aotrou and Itroun (1930), a poem of 508 lines modelled on the Breton lay genre.

The poem had been abandoned for nearly 20 years in 1955, and the publication was complete of The Lord of the Rings when Tolkien expressed his wish to return to his "long poem" and complete it. But it remained unfinished, nonetheless.

Publication history
The existence of the poem was known publicly since the Tolkien biography by Humphrey Carpenter, published in 1977. Carpenter noted that the poem
"has alliteration but no rhyme. [...] In his own Arthurian poem [Tolkien] did not touch on the Grail but began an individual rendering of the Morte d'Arthur, in which the king and Gawain go to war in 'Saxon lands' but are summoned home by news of Mordred's treachery. The poem was never finished, but it was read and approved by E. V. Gordon, and by R. W. Chambers, Professor of English at London University, who considered it to be 'great stuff – really heroic, quite apart from its value as showing how the Beowulf metre can be used in modern English'."
Carpenter also cited a passage from the text of the poem, to make the point that it is one of the very few instances in Tolkien's expansive work where sexual passion is given explicit literary treatment, in this case Mordred's "unsated passion" for Guinever:
His bed was barren   there black phantoms
of desire unsated   and savage fury
in his brain had brooded   till bleak morning

After Tolkien's death, his Arthurian poem would come to be one of the longest-awaited unedited works of his. According to John D. Rateliff, Rayner Unwin had announced plans to edit the poem as early as 1985, but the edition was postponed in favour of "more pressing projects" (such as The History of Middle-earth edited 1983–1996), answering the demand for background on Tolkien's legendarium more than his literary production in other areas.

See also
The Legend of Sigurd and Gudrún

References

Further reading

 Verlyn Flieger,   "Arthurian Romance" in: J.R.R. Tolkien Encyclopedia: Scholarship and Critical Assessment (2006).

External links
 Ruth Lacon, On The Fall of Arthur: Pre-Publication Speculation By a Longtime Student  20 March 2013 (tolkienlibrary.com)
 Tolkien's handwriting scans 20 December 2009 The Fountain Pen Network

Poetry by J. R. R. Tolkien
Modern Arthurian fiction
Poems published posthumously
Unfinished poems
HarperCollins books
1930s poems
2013 books
Epic poems in English